Roland Benschneider (born 22 August 1980) is a German former professional footballer, who works as sports director at FC Energie Cottbus.

Playing career 
Born in Neuruppin, Benschneider honed his craft as a defender with FC Neubrandenburg and FC Energie Cottbus. In the 2000–01 season he switched to the Regionalliga Nord and played for Tennis Borussia Berlin.

Only one year into his stint at Borussia, the player, who grew greatly in confidence during this period, moved to SV Eintracht Trier 05 in the Southern Regional League, where by 2002–03 he was to become a fully-fledged squad player.

In the next season he moved to Arminia Bielefeld, whose league position he helped to boost in the subsequent weeks and months. Uwe Rapolder was to notice the player, and he joined 1. FC Köln for €200,000. However, in the opening season Benschneider played only twelve full games. In the 2005–06 season he played mainly as a substitute once again, and scored his first goal against FC Schalke 04.

Post-playing career 
In September 2011, Benschneider was hired as team manager at SV Elversberg. He had different roles in the club, and he ended his time in the club in 2014 as sports director.

In April 2014, Benschneider joined FC Energie Cottbus where he got the job as sports director. He signed a contract until 2016.

References

External links 
 

1980 births
Living people
Sportspeople from Neuruppin
German footballers
Germany B international footballers
Association football defenders
Bundesliga players
2. Bundesliga players
3. Liga players
FC Energie Cottbus players
Tennis Borussia Berlin players
SV Eintracht Trier 05 players
Arminia Bielefeld players
1. FC Köln players
1. FC Köln II players
FC Augsburg players
SV Sandhausen players
Footballers from Brandenburg
1. FC Neubrandenburg 04 players